Hrynky is a village in Kremenets Raion of Ternopil Oblast in Ukraine.

Since 12 June 2020, it is located in the Lanivtsi urban hromada, one of the hromadas of Ukraine.

History
Hrynky was first mention in 1583 as the property of Prince Stefan Zbarazh. On 1 January 1924, the Lanivtsi parish, which had been liquidated at the time, was restored as the Lanivtsi commune of Kremenets Raion, and the village of Hrynky, withdrawn from the Bilozirka commune, was annexed to it.

Demographics
Native language as of the Ukrainian Census of 2001:
 Ukrainian 99.62%
 Others 0.38%

References

Villages in Kremenets Raion